Kim Yu-geun, known as Dr. Tom Kim, is a Korean-American physician who runs a free clinic called the Free Medical Clinic of America for the poor. In 2010, he received the Order of Civil Merit from the South Korean government.

Early life
Kim was born in North Korea but moved to South Korea with his family in 1951, when he was 6 years old. He later moved to the United States.

Bibliography
Five Fingers: The Story of the Free Medical Clinic of America

Awards
Order of Civil Merit of South Korea
Anderson County Hero Award

References

External links
The Free Medical Clinic of America
미국에서 17년간 무료의술 한인의사 

American people of Korean descent
Living people
Recipients of the Order of Civil Merit (Korea)
Year of birth missing (living people)